Michał Jan Pac (1730–1787) was a Polish-Lithuanian nobleman, Lithuanian Marshal of the Bar Confederation from 1769 until 1772, Chamberlain of King Augustus.

He lived in exile in France after the defeat of the Confederation.

In 1780, he bought the castle and the village of Marainville in Lorraine; his steward, Adam Weydlich, made acquaintance with the village syndic, François, who had a son, Nicolas, born in 1771. After Pac's death, the Weydlichs left France for Poland, and young Nicolas emigrated with them; in 1810, he was to have a son, Frédéric Chopin.

Bibliography 
 "Polski Słownik Biograficzny" (tom 24, str. 729)

References 

1730 births
1787 deaths
Michal Jan
Polish nobility
Members of the Sejm of the Polish–Lithuanian Commonwealth
Radom confederates
Bar confederates